The Grudge is a 2020 American  psychological supernatural horror film  written and directed by Nicolas Pesce, and produced by Sam Raimi, Rob Tapert, and  Takashige Ichise. At first announced as a reboot of the 2004 American remake and the original 2002 Japanese horror film Ju-On: The Grudge, the film ended up taking place before and during the events of the 2004 film and its two direct sequels, and is the fourth installment in the American The Grudge film series. The film stars Andrea Riseborough, Demián Bichir, John Cho, Betty Gilpin, Lin Shaye, and Jacki Weaver, and follows a police officer who investigates several murders that are seemingly connected to a single house.

A sequel was announced in 2011, with a release date of 2013 or 2014. In March 2014, it was officially announced that a reboot was in the works, with Jeff Buhler set to write the script. In July 2017, filmmaker Nicolas Pesce was hired for rewrites, based on Buhler's script, and to direct the film. Principal photography on the film began on May 7, 2018, in Winnipeg, Manitoba, and finished on June 23, 2018.

The Grudge was released in the United States on January 3, 2020, by Sony Pictures Releasing. The film had grossed over $49 million worldwide and received mostly negative reviews from critics, who criticized its jumpscares, characterization and the screenplay’s pace and lack of originality, but praised its performances and atmosphere.

Plot

2004
In 2004, live-in nurse Fiona Landers leaves a house in Tokyo, appearing disturbed. Fiona informs her co-worker, Yoko, that she is returning to America before encountering the ghost of Kayako Saeki. Fiona arrives at her home on 44 Reyburn Drive in a small town in Pennsylvania, reuniting with her husband Sam and young daughter Melinda. Kayako's curse, however, possesses Fiona, causing her to bludgeon Sam to death and drown Melinda before committing suicide by stabbing herself in the throat.

Detectives Goodman and Wilson investigate the Landers murders. Unsettled by the house, Goodman refuses to enter, while Wilson enters to examine the scene. Upon exiting, Wilson slowly starts to lose his mind, and eventually becomes hysterical when he spots Fiona's ghost outside Goodman's car; after which he attempts to commit suicide by shooting himself, but survives, leaving him disfigured and committed to a psychiatric asylum. Goodman stops looking into the case.

Shortly after the Landers are murdered, but before anyone discovers their deaths, real estate agents Peter and Nina Spencer learn that their unborn child will most likely be born with the rare genetic disorder ALD. Peter goes to look into selling 44 Reyburn Drive and stumbles across Melinda's ghost, presuming her to be a lost girl, who is bleeding profusely from her nose.

While on the phone with Peter, Nina agrees that they should keep their child. Peter is attacked by Fiona and Melinda's ghosts before fleeing the house and is quickly corrupted by the curse. The possessed Peter returns to his home, where he kills Nina and their unborn child before he drowns himself (or possibly killed by Fiona's ghost) in the bathtub.

2005
In 2005, elderly couple Faith and William Matheson move into the house. Faith suffers from dementia and a terminal illness. After moving in, Faith is infected by the curse and starts to see Melinda around the house. Her sanity rapidly declines, causing William to call over Lorna Moody, an assisted suicide consultant.

Disturbed, Lorna suggests to William that they leave the house, but William reveals that he is aware of the ghosts and suggests that it implies a future where people get to be with their loved ones after death. Lorna later discovers that Faith has killed William and has sliced off her own fingers. Lorna flees in horror only to be attacked by Sam's ghost in her car which crashes, killing her.

2006
In 2006, rookie detective Muldoon moves to town with her son Burke following her husband's death from cancer. Muldoon along with Goodman, her new partner, are called to the woods where Lorna's corpse has been discovered. Goodman becomes uncomfortable when they learn that Lorna had been visiting 44 Reyburn Drive. Noticing this, Muldoon questions him, and he reveals his suspicion that the house is cursed, and states he wants nothing to do with it.

Muldoon goes to the house, discovering a disoriented Faith and William's corpse. Faith is taken to a hospital, where she sees Melinda and throws herself off a staircase landing, committing suicide. As Muldoon continues her research into the case, she is haunted by the ghosts of the Landers. She visits Wilson in the asylum, who tells her that all people who enter the house will become victims of the curse. Wilson then gouges out his eyes so he can stop seeing the ghosts. Fearful that the curse may make her hurt her son, Muldoon confides in Goodman and learns that the curse began with a family in Japan; Fiona is the one who brought it abroad. After she is attacked by the Landers' ghosts again, Muldoon goes to the house and douses it in gasoline as she sees visions of how Fiona murdered her family. She is tricked into seeing Burke, however she realizes it isn't really him after he fails to repeat a phrase the two of them use regularly. The house burns to the ground as Muldoon embraces her real son outside.

Sometime later, Muldoon hugs Burke before he leaves for school, only to see the real Burke leave the house. The "Burke" she is hugging is revealed to be Melinda. Muldoon is dragged away by Fiona's ghost, becoming the next victim of the curse.

International ending
After Muldoon burns the house to the ground, she sees Burke watching her. Sometime later, the pair is driving on a road toward a new home. As they pull into the driveway of their home and enter, the credits begin rolling.

Cast

The characters of Toshio Saeki and Yoko from previous The Grudge films additionally briefly appear in the film's opening, respectively portrayed by an uncredited hand model and voice actress. Takako Fuji, who previously played Kayako Saeki in the franchise, voiced Faith Matheson in the Japanese dub of the film.

Production

Development
A fourth installment of the American The Grudge film series was first announced in August 2011, to be developed by Ghost House Pictures and Mandate Pictures. It was also announced that the film was set to be a reboot, though it was not confirmed whether the film would be a theatrical release or direct-to-video like The Grudge 3. In November 2011, Roy Lee, who was an executive producer of the previous three films, revealed that the producers were still undecided on what the fourth installment would entail. According to Lee, they were still "hearing takes from writers on what they could bring to the table on what their thoughts are on a new version".

On March 20, 2014, it was announced that Jeff Buhler had been hired to write the script, and that the film would be produced by Ghost House Pictures and Good Universe. Buhler stated in April that the film would not involve the 2004 film or any of the Japanese Ju-On films. Instead it would introduce new ghosts, characters, and mythology. Buhler also clarified that although the mythology would be pushed forward, they would try to keep the "concept and spirits" of the films. It was also reported that the character of Kayako Saeki, who had been central to the previous three installments, would be absent from the reboot.

In early July 2017, it was announced Nicolas Pesce had been hired as director and that he would be rewriting Buhler's draft of the script. Pesce has stated that it would be "[much] darker, grittier, and more realistic".

Star Lin Shaye stated,

Casting
In March 2018, it was announced that Andrea Riseborough would star in the film. Later, it was announced that Demián Bichir had also joined the cast, and that filming was set to start in May 2018. John Cho and Lin Shaye were added to the cast in March 2018, and in April 2018, Jacki Weaver, Betty Gilpin, William Sadler, and Frankie Faison also signed on.

Filming
Principal photography began on May 7, 2018, in Winnipeg, Manitoba, and ended on June 23, 2018. Additional photography and reshoots took place in June 2019.

Release
The Grudge was released by Sony Pictures Releasing on January 3, 2020.

Home media
The Grudge was released on Digital HD on March 10, 2020, and on DVD and Blu-ray on March 24, 2020.

Reception

Box office
In the United States and Canada, The Grudge was projected to gross $11–15 million from 2,642 theaters in its opening weekend. The film made $5.4 million on its first day, including $1.8 million from Thursday night previews. It went on to debut to $11.4 million, finishing fifth and marking the lowest opening of any U.S. theatrical film in the series. The film fell 69% in its second weekend to $3.5 million, finishing eleventh.

, The Grudge has grossed $21.2 million in the United States and Canada, and $28.3 million in other territories, for a worldwide total of $49.5 million, against a production budget of $10–14 million.

Critical response
The website's critical consensus reads, "Dull and derivative, the rebooted Grudge wastes a talented cast and filmmaker on watered-down scares that may leave viewers nursing grievances of their own." On Metacritic, the film has a weighted average score of 41 out of 100, based on 28 critics, indicating "mixed or average reviews". Audiences polled by CinemaScore gave the film a rare average grade of "F" on an A+ to F scale (one of only 22 films to receive the rating), while those at PostTrak gave it an average 0.5 out of 5 stars.

Writing for the San Francisco Chronicle, Mick LaSalle said the film was all premise and no development, adding, "I saw this movie in the middle of the day, having had a great night's sleep, and I had to slap myself awake a few times." Varietys Owen Gleiberman called the film "a reboot of a remake of a film that wasn't all that scary to begin with", and wrote, "The Grudge plods on as if it were something more than formula gunk, cutting back and forth among the thinly written unfortunates who've been touched by the curse of that house." Nick Allen of RogerEbert.com gave the film 3 out of 4 stars, saying that it is "often as nasty as you want it to be, its cheesy jump-scares and generic packaging be damned".

Noel Murray of The Los Angeles Times wrote, "This is not a 'fun' horror picture. It's about miseries both supernatural and mundane. And, yes, it's scary. Pesce's art-film roots are evident in the movie's slow-burn first hour. But in the final third, The Grudge piles on the explicit gore and jump scares — all leading to a final scene and final shot as terrifying as anything in the original series. If the angry, vengeful 'Ju-On' ghosts must endure, they might as well be deployed by someone who knows how to make their attacks bruising." Ben Kenigsberg of The New York Times said, "The remake remains cursed by a fatally hokey concept."

Future
In September 2019, The Grudge director Nicolas Pesce expressed interest in a crossover film between The Grudge and the American The Ring film series, which was done for the first time in 2016 with Sadako vs. Kayako. In January 2020, Pesce expressed further interest in a sequel being set in both a different part of the world than America or Japan, and in a different "less contemporary" time period compared to previous films.

See also
 List of ghost films

Notes

References

External links
 

2020 films
2020 horror films
2020s supernatural horror films
American sequel films
American supernatural horror films
Screen Gems films
Fiction about familicide
Films about curses
American ghost films
Ghost House Pictures films
Films produced by Sam Raimi
Films set in 2004
Films set in 2005
Films set in 2006
Films set in Pennsylvania
Films set in Tokyo
Interquel films
The Grudge (film series)
Asian-American horror films
Films shot in Winnipeg
Murder–suicide in films
Films directed by Nicolas Pesce
Films with screenplays by Nicolas Pesce
Films scored by the Newton Brothers
Japan in non-Japanese culture
2020s English-language films
4DX films
2020s American films